Georgina Oladapo Day (née Oladapo; born 15 May 1967) is an English former sprinter and long jumper. A bronze medallist in the 4 × 100 metres relay at the 1985 European Junior Championships, she went on to be a member of the British quartet that finished fifth in the 4 × 400 metres relay final at the 1995 World Championships and to represent Great Britain in the women's 4 × 400 metres relay at the 1996 Atlanta Olympics.

Born in Lewisham, she achieved her best times in the 100 metres and 200 metres with 11.64 and 23.65 secs in 1985. Her long jump best of 6.52 metres was set when finishing second at the 1984 AAA Championships, while her 400 metres best of 52.48 secs was set when finishing second at the 1996 AAA Championships.

Oladapo Day has five children and is married to the comedian Steve Day.

International competitions

References

1967 births
Living people
Athletes (track and field) at the 1996 Summer Olympics
British female sprinters
Olympic athletes of Great Britain
Place of birth missing (living people)
Olympic female sprinters